Chu Hai may refer to:
Chūhai, an alcoholic drink from Japan
Chu Hai College of Higher Education, a tertiary education provider in Hong Kong
Zhuhai, a city in China